The 2017–18 UCLA Bruins women's basketball team represented the University of California, Los Angeles during the 2017–18 NCAA Division I women's basketball season. The Bruins, led by seventh year head coach Cori Close, played their home games at the Pauley Pavilion and are members of the Pac-12 Conference. They finished the season 27–8, 14–4 in Pac-12 play to finish in a tie for third place. They advanced to the semifinals of the Pac-12 women's tournament where they lost to Oregon. They received an at-large bid to the NCAA women's tournament in which they defeated American and Creighton in the first and second rounds, respectively. They went on to defeat Texas in the Sweet Sixteen and advance to the program's first Elite Eight since 1999. They lost to Mississippi State in the Elite Eight.

Offseason

Departures

2017 recruiting class

Roster

Schedule

|-
!colspan=9 style="background:#; color:gold;"| Exhibition

|-
!colspan=9 style="background:#; color:gold;"| Non-conference regular season

|-
!colspan=9 style="background:#; color:gold;"| Pac-12 regular season

|-
!colspan=9 style="background:#;"| Pac-12 Women's Tournament

|-
!colspan=9 style="background:#;"| NCAA Women's Tournament

Rankings
2017–18 NCAA Division I women's basketball rankings

See also
2017–18 UCLA Bruins men's basketball team

Notes
 Jan. 29 – Jordin Canada named Pac-12 Player of the Week
 Feb. 27 – Jordin Canada and Monique Billings named to the All-Pac-12 and All-Defensive teams. Michaela Onyenwere was named to the All-Freshman team and junior Kennedy Burke was honorable mention All-Pac-12 and honorable mention All-Defensive team
 March 25 – Jordin Canada and Monique Billings were named to the NCAA Tournament Kansas City Region All-Regional team

References

UCLA
UCLA Bruins women's basketball
UCLA Bruins basketball, women
UCLA Bruins basketball, women
UCLA Bruins basketball, women
UCLA Bruins basketball, women
UCLA